Linko may refer to:

Linkou District, New Taipei (formerly Linkou, Taipei County)
Linko, Guinea